Football is the most popular sport in Iran, with wrestling and volleyball as close contenders. Football has been a part of life for Iranians for many decades now and is played in schools, streets, and football clubs nationwide.

History

Early days
Football was played in Iran as early as 1898, when a team of British residents of Esfahan played a team of Armenians.
In south western Iran the game was introduced in 1907 by British sailors and workers. At that time they were working at port cities Bushehr, Khorramshahr, Bandar Abbas and major oil refineries such as Abadan and Masjed Soleiman in the province of Khuzestan, the latter area even boasting a football league. The local Iranian employees of the company first looked on, and then began replacing individual players on the teams, until they formed their own teams. These young Iranian football players met some hostility from their social environment for participating in the games of the "infidels," and were at times beaten up and pelted with stones.

In 1907, the British Ambassador in Tehran Cecil Spring Rice founded Iran's first Football Tournament which had only 3 teams: Embassy of Great Britain, Imperial Bank of Persia and Indo-European Telegraph Company.

In the same year, the Tehran Football Association Club, an organising body for arranging football matches, was established. All teams were made up of British residents of Tehran, although when teams didn't have enough players they sometimes chose Iranian bystanders to come on the field and play. The matches were played at or around Mashq Square. The first Iranian player was Karim Zandi who played from 1908 to 1916. This period saw increasing interest in the game among Iranians.

In 1910, Samuel M. Jordan, the principal of the American School (currently known as Alborz High School) in Tehran, introduced football as part of the school's curriculum.  Four years later 1914, the start of World War I put an end to these football matches and programs.

In other parts of southern Iran, (e.g. cities such as Shiraz) football was introduced by the British officers of the South Persia Rifles (1916–1921) to the Iranian troops they commanded, who then spread the game among the civilian population. The period following World War 1 saw football matches recommence in Tehran. Then two years later, in 1920, a number of Iranian and British football enthusiasts founded the Iranian Football Association (Majmaa-i Football-i Iran) to encourage Iranian players and to popularize the game. The director of the Imperial Bank of Persia, James McMurray, became its president, and he was assisted by the legation doctor, A.R. Neligan; they each donated a cup to be awarded to winning teams.

1920 also saw the establishment of Iran's first football club called Iran Club. Soon after the alumni of American College and the students of School of Political Science also formed teams. The Iran Club squad consisted of Karim Zandi, Khan Sardar brothers, Amir-Aslani brothers, Mohammad Ali Shokooh, Azizollah Afkkhami, Reza Kalantar, Sheybani, Hasan Meftah, Herand, Galustyan, Khajeh-Noori, Reza Rabizadeh, Hambarson, Ashrafi. This group of players won the Tehran Association Cup in 1923. In the same year a new club was established called Tehran Club, followed by the creation of the Armenian Sports Club and the Toofan Club, and in 1925 the Tehran Club reached the final and defeated the British Select Team of Tehran 2-1.

In this period a number of footballers who had played abroad, such as Hossein Sadaghiani and the Khan-Sardar brothers, who played in the Belgian Football Leagues, returned to Iran. Hossein Sadaghiani for instance after returning to Iran temporarily from Europe, helped to establish the first football club (Ferdowsi Club) in Mashhad. During his one-year stay in Mashhad, he arranged football matches between the club and the British Consulate-General. Before this, football was only played by foreign residents in Mashhad (especially the employees of the Telegraph Office and the British Consulate-General).

In places that had not entertained a significant foreign presence, such as Ardabil, it seems that the game was introduced in the 1920s by young men who had spent some time in the Caucasus.

1950s to 1970s
By the 1950s and early 60s, football had become a popular sport in Iran, and teams from Khuzestan were considered the most successful. Tehran then slowly started becoming the football capital of Iran, and numerous great clubs emerged from there. Shahin FC, Oghab FC, and Taj, were all Tehran teams established in the mid-1940s and are still active.
As the number of club teams increased the need for a national league became apparent, and ever since 1960, with the exception of a few years, a nationwide football league has existed in Iran. The Takhte Jamshid Cup, Azadegan League and the IPL being the most important ones.

21st century

Female spectators
In the AFC Champions League (organised by the Asian Football Confederation, problems on the Iranian sides were attracting media attention. In addition, International Arabic and English-language media reported on the violation of women's rights in Iranian stadiums, and the fact that Iranian women had been banned from football stadiums for about 40 years wince 2019, by the Iranian government. In 2018, FIFA, as the parent of the AFC, pressured Iran to let women into the stadiums in the ACL, but Iran only allowed a limited number of women to watch the 2018 final, which called by the media "a show". In October 2019, Iranian women allowed to watch a 2022 World Cup qualifier, when the men's team beat Cambodian football team 14-0. Up to 3,500 women attended the game in the 80,000-seat Azadi Stadium.

Other challenges

Persepolis and Esteghlal have been challenged by other sides due to direct ownership by the government of the Islamic Republic. In 2021, AFC investigated the matter.

Iran national football team (Team Melli)

The predecessor of Iran national football team

Tehran XI

In 1926 Tehran XI (selected players from Tehran Club, Toofan and Armenian Sports Club)
traveled across the border to Baku, USSR, this was the first away football match for an Iranian team. This Tehran Select team is the predecessor of Iran's national football team.

In 1929 it was time for a return visit, and so a team from Baku was invited to play in Tehran in late November. To impress the visitors, grass had been planted on the state-owned football field. The last of the three games, all of which were won by the visitors, was attended by Abdolhossein Teymourtash, the powerful minister of court. The humiliating defeats, suffered on home ground, caused great consternation, so much so that some young men gave up football altogether. In subsequent years the interest in football waned, and newspapers hardly reported on those matches that did take place. However, all this changed with the return of crown prince Mohammad Reza Pahlavi from Switzerland in 1936 and arrival of Thomas R Gibson in the 1930s to promote the game.

Head Coach:  Mir Mehdi Varzandeh
Squad: 

The results were as follow:

World War Two period
One man can be remembered, who contributed to Iranian football during the post-World War One period. Hossein Sadaghiani became active in sharing the knowledge of the game and also with growth of football, he became the first head coach of the Iranian national team, who later coached football teams of University of Tehran. The first match that the Iranian national football team played was on August 25, 1941 away at Afghanistan.

In 1942, when the Allied Forces were in Iran, Iran national football team defeated a British Military XI team in a friendly match played in Tehran. Match details as follow:

Iran team lineup were:  Fathollah Minbashian, Mansour Hajian, Abbas Qarib, Aziz Farzanegan, Abbas Tandidehgar, Jamshid Malekshahi, Bakhtiar, Akbar Toofan, Ahmad Izadpanah and 2 more players. The team's head coach was Hossein Sadaghiani.

British Army XI lineup  included players such as Wilf Mannion, Migger and Bick, Bertie Mee, Jimmy McCabe.

Post-World War Two period

In the 1960s and 1970s, Iran established itself as one of Asia's top sides, winning the Asian Cup in 1968, 1972 and 1976, the only team to win the tournament three times in a row. In 1964 Iran qualified for the Olympic Games, but they finished last in their group with one point which came in a 1–1 draw against Mexico. Iran also qualified for the 1972, 1976 and 1980 Olympic Games. In 1978, Iran qualified for its first FIFA World Cup, held in Argentina. In the 1980s the Iran–Iraq War hindered the development of the national team and Iran missed out on several World Cups due to withdrawing from the qualifying stage. After a twenty-year absence, Iran qualified for the 1998 FIFA World Cup and recorded their first-ever World Cup victory, defeating the United States 2–1. Iran has also more recently qualified for the tournament in 2006, 2014, 2018 and 2022, failing to advance past the group stage on each occasion.

Youth national teams
Iran fields youth national teams predominantly at the U17, U20 and U23 levels having enjoyed moderate success.

U17
The U17 national team first qualified for the AFC U-16 Championship in 1996. Iran finished runners up in the 2000 AFC U-17 Championship, having gone undefeated in the group stage and defeating Vietnam 4–0 in the semi-final. Iran lost in the final to Oman, but qualified to the FIFA U17 World Cup in 2001. In 2008 Iran won the AFC U16 Championships for the first time after defeating South Korea in the finals. As a result, Iran also qualified for their second World Cup in 2009.

Other football teams
Iran national futsal team: The Iran national futsal team represents Iran in international futsal competitions and is controlled by the Futsal Commission of the Iranian Football Federation. The "Kings of Asian Futsal" are by far the strongest Asian team and one of the best teams in the world according to the Futsal World Ranking. The Iranians are the regular participants of the FIFA Futsal World Cup reaching the third place in 2016 after eliminating the favorites, Brazil. Iran have won the first Futsal Confederations Cup in 2009 and also reached the second place in the Grand Prix de Futsal known as Futsal Mini-World Cup in multiple editions.

Iran national beach soccer team: Iran has won the AFC Beach Soccer Championship a record two times (2013, 2017) and has placed in the top four in every edition. Iran has also appeared in the FIFA Beach Soccer World Cup seven times, reaching the quarterfinals on three occasions (2013, 2015, 2017), and finishing in third place once (2017).

Football structure
The league and national team are administrated by the Iranian FA known as the I.R.I.F.F. The I.R.I.F.F has also been a member of FIFA since 1945 and the Asian Football Confederation since 1958.  The Federation receives most of its budget from the Iranian government's Physical Education Department, and also from sponsorships with various companies.

League system

The current structure has been in place since 2001. The Persian Gulf Pro League is the highest level of club football in Iran. Below it is the Azadegan League, also known as the 1st division, which consists of two twelve-team groups. One level further down from that is the 2nd division which is made up of 28 teams evenly distributed into two groups. One step down, and the final nationwide league, is the 3rd division. This level has eight groups and 45 teams. Each groups contains teams that are located in the same area of the nation. The final level of the football system consists of 28 provincial leagues. Local teams from each province participate in these leagues, and some of the leagues are divided into further divisions.

The system works with a promotion-relegation system, meaning that a team from the lowest level of the system can make it to the top level after a number of years. The number of teams in each league often changes from season to season, due to the lack of any professional management in the lower levels of the system. Currently the IPL is the only league that is considered professional, despite many of its rules about club facilities and management being broken. It is not uncommon for teams in the lower levels of the system to change team names because of sponsorship issues or for teams to completely withdraw from a competition.

The top four levels of the men's system are managed by the FFIRI, while the bottom level leagues are managed by their respective provincial football committee. The Kowsar Women Football League is the primary women's football league in Iran.

Major stadiums

Main Article List of football stadiums in Iran
Azadi Stadium, Tehran
Ali Daei Stadium, Ardebil
Dr. Azodi Stadium, Rasht
Bagh Shomal Stadium, Tabriz
Enghelab Stadium, Karaj
Foolad Shahr Stadium, Isfahan
Ghadir stadim, Ahvaz
Hafezieh Stadium, Shiraz
Imam Reza Stadium, Mashhad 
Naghsh-e-Jahan Stadium, Isfahan
Pars Shiraz Stadium, Shiraz 
Rah Ahan Stadium, Tehran
Samen Stadium, Mashhad
Shahid Bahonar Stadium, Kerman
Shahid Dastgerdi Stadium, Tehran
Shahid Shiroudi Stadium, Tehran
Shohada Stadium, Noshahr
Takhti Stadium, Abadan
Takhti Stadium, Ahvaz
Takhti Stadium, Bandar-e Anzali
Takhti Stadium, Mashhad
Takhti Stadium, Tehran
Yadegar Emam Stadium, Qom
Yadegar Emam Stadium, Tabriz
Shohada Haft Tir Stadium, Babol
Shahid Vatani Stadium, Qaemshahr

See also

Azadegan League (also called 1st Division)
Football around the world
Futsal in Iran
Hazfi Cup (Domestic cup)
Iran national football team
Persian Gulf Pro League
List of Iranian football club owners
Sports in Iran
Women's Football in Iran
Kowsar Women Football League

References

iranica.com
Parssport: History of Football in Iran
parssport.ir
hamshahrionline.ir
twof.blogfa.com
ispkavosh.persiangig.com
A Political History of Football in Iran, H. E. Chehabi; Iranian Studies, Vol. 35, No. 4, Sports and Games (Autumn, 2002), pp. 371–402, Published by: Taylor & Francis, Ltd. on behalf of International Society for Iranian Studies

External links

Iran's National Football Federation
Iran's Football Leagues Live Coverage
PFDC - Persian Football Dot Com 
Iranian Corner
Iran Sports Press
Iran Football News - parstimes.com
National team archive
Pars Football
Persian Football League

 
Sport in Iran